Alfred Seymour (16 February 1843 – 31 January 1897) was an English first-class cricketer.

Seymour was the son of British Diplomat Sir George Hamilton Seymour and the Hon. Gertrude, daughter of Henry Trevor, 20th Baron Dacre. He was educated at Rugby School, although he did not represent the college cricket team.

Seymour later became an ensign in the 16th Regiment of Foot, before transferring to the Rifle Brigade in 1861. He was promoted to lieutenant in 1866, before retiring from military service in 1869.

In the same year as his retirement from the army, Seymour made his first-class debut for Lancashire against Sussex at the Royal Brunswick Ground in Brighton. This was the only first-class match he played for Lancashire.

The following year Seymour represented Hampshire in a single first-class match against his former club Lancashire, at Old Trafford.

The 1881 Census has Seymour living with his family at Hollybrook House, Millbrook, Hampshire, with his profession stated as a magistrate.

Seymour died at Folkestone, Kent on 31 January 1897.

External links
Alfred Seymour at Cricinfo
Alfred Seymour at CricketArchive

1843 births
1897 deaths
Sportspeople from Brussels
English cricketers
Lancashire cricketers
Hampshire cricketers
Bedfordshire and Hertfordshire Regiment officers
Rifle Brigade officers
Military personnel from Brussels